Freocorus turgidus is a species of beetle in the family Cerambycidae, and the only species in the genus Freocorus. It was described by Hunt and Breuning in 1955.

References

Crossotini
Beetles described in 1955
Monotypic Cerambycidae genera